Dear Son is a 2018 Tunisian drama film directed by Mohamed Ben Attia. It was selected to screen in the Directors' Fortnight section at the 2018 Cannes Film Festival. It was selected as the Tunisian entry for the Best International Feature Film at the 92nd Academy Awards, but it was not nominated.

Plot
Riadh is about to retire from his work as a forklift operator in Tunis. The life he shares with his wife Nazli revolves around their son Sami, who suffers from repeated migraine attacks while preparing for his high school exams. When he finally seems to be getting better, Sami suddenly disappears.

Cast
 Mohamed Dhrif as Riadh
 Mouna Mejri as Nazli 
 Imen Cherif as Sameh
  Zakaria Ben Ayyed as Sami

See also
 List of submissions to the 92nd Academy Awards for Best International Feature Film
 List of Tunisian submissions for the Academy Award for Best International Feature Film

References

External links
 

2018 films
2018 drama films
2010s Arabic-language films
Tunisian drama films